James Ward was the defending champion, but lost the re-match of the 2013 final to James Duckworth with the Australian winning the title this year, 6–3, 6–4.

Seeds

Draw

Finals

Top half

Bottom half

References 
 Main draw
 Qualifying draw

2014 MS
Kentucky Bank Tennis Championships - Men's Singles